Hurler–Scheie syndrome is a genetic disorder caused by the buildup of glycosaminoglycans (GAGs) in various organ tissues. It is a cutaneous condition, also characterized by mild mental retardation and corneal clouding. Respiratory problems, sleep apnea, and heart disease may develop in adolescence.

Hurler–Scheie syndrome is classified as a lysosomal storage disease. Patients with Hurler–Scheie syndrome lack the ability to break down GAGs in their lysosomes due a deficiency of the enzyme iduronidase.

All forms of mucopolysaccharidosis type I (MPS I) are a spectrum of the same disease. Hurler-Sheie is the subtype of MPS I with intermediate severity. Hurler syndrome is the most severe form, while Scheie syndrome is the least severe form. Some clinicians consider the differences between Hurler, Hurler-Scheie, and Scheie syndromes to be arbitrary. Instead, they classify these patients as having "severe", "intermediate", or "attenuated" MPS I.

See also 
 Mucopolysaccharidosis

References

External links 

Proteoglycan metabolism disorders
Syndromes